The 1872 Aberdeen by-election was fought on 29 June 1872.  The election occurred as a result of the death of the incumbent Liberal MP, William Henry Sykes.  It was won by the "Moderate Liberal" candidate John Farley Leith against the official Liberal candidate James William Barclay, whose reputation as a Radical led to a split in the local party

References

1872 in Scotland
1870s elections in Scotland
1872 elections in the United Kingdom
By-elections to the Parliament of the United Kingdom in Aberdeen constituencies
19th century in Aberdeen
June 1872 events